Fudbalski klub Ribnica is a football club from Konik, Podgorica, Montenegro. They currently compete in the Montenegrin Third League – Center.

History

Period 1974–2006 
FK Ribnica was founded in 1974, at Konik, the biggest settlement of Podgorica. There were several sports teams by the same name, but they no longer exist. The club is named after the Ribnica river, which flows through the Konik and Podgorica center.
During the seventies, Ribnica played in the Fourth League – Central region (lowest rank in SFR Yugoslavia). At that time, big rivalry between FK Ribnica and neighbouring FK Grafičar was born.
In the 1983–84 season, Ribnica won the title of the Fourth League – Central region champion, after 24 weeks long competition with the teams Grafičar, Gorštak, Kom, Zora, Napredak, Avijatičar, Radnički, Crvena zvijezda, Metalac, Partizan, Poštar and Bratstvo. With that success, FK Ribnica, for the first time in club history, gained promotion to the Montenegrin Republic League.
After six consecutive seasons in the Republic League, the biggest success at that time, FK Ribnica made on season 1990–91. Finished as a second-placed team in Montenegrin Republic League, Ribnica was promoted to the Yugoslav Third Inter-Republic League – West. During that season in Republic League, FK Ribnica scored 71 goals in 26 games, which was an absolute record in the team's history.
The club participated in the Yugoslav Third League for one season (1991–92), finished in 16th position. After that, FK Ribnica was relegated to the Montenegrin Republic League.
At FR Yugoslavia era (1992–2006), FK Ribnica played majority of seasons in the Montenegrin Republic League (third-tier competition), but never again gained promotion to federal competitions (Second league). In the 1994–95 season, FK Ribnica made the biggest victory in team history, against FK Tekstilac (9–1).
After the 2003–04 season, placed in 14th position, FK Ribnica was relegated from the Montenegrin Republic League after 20 consecutive seasons. At the end of that season, the team lost against FK Berane away with 1–11, which was the biggest defeat of FK Ribnica until then.
During the 1990s and the first half of the 2000s, FK Ribnica started their careers many famous players from Montenegro, as Vukašin Poleksić, Srđan Kljajević, Senad Rizvanaj, Ivan Čarapić, Saša Ivanović and others.

Period 2006–present 
After Montenegrin independence, FK Ribnica became a member of the Montenegrin Third League. During the seasons 2006–07 and 2007–08, FK Ribnica won the trophy of the Central Region Cup winner and participated in the Montenegrin Cup seasons 2006–07, 2007–08 and 2008–09.
In the 2007–08 season, FK Ribnica won the title of the Third Montenegrin League – Central champion and in the playoffs against FK Mornar and FK Polimlje, they gained promotion to the Montenegrin Second League, which was the historical success for the club. FK Ribnica played only one season in the Second League, finishing as a last-placed team in season 2008–09. In May 2009, FK Ribnica was defeated against FK Otrant in Ulcinj, 2–12. That was the highest defeat in the history of Montenegrin Second League.
After one year in higher rank, FK Ribnica was relegated to the Third League, where they are still playing.
Last success FK Ribnica made at Montenegrin Cup 2013–14 season. As a bottom-league member, they eliminated a member of the Second League, FK Igalo in first leg (3–1), but were defeated in the Round of 16 against First League side OFK Grbalj (1–3; 1–3).

FK Ribnica in Montenegrin Second League
FK Ribnica played one season in the Montenegrin Second League – 2008/09. During its 33 weeks, Ribnica made two wins and four draws with 27 defeats. With only 10 points earned, FK Ribnica made a record with negative score since the Montenegrin Second League was established. Except that, FK Ribnica made few another negative records in the history of the Second League – as a lowest number of wins at one season (2), highest number of losses (27), highest number of conceded goals (82), longest run without wins (14 games), longest losing streak (14 games) and biggest defeat (vs. FK Otrant 2–12).

FK Ribnica in Yugoslav federal competitions 
FK Ribnica spent the 1991–92 season in the Yugoslav Third Inter-Republic League – West. That was the only season in history that FK Ribnica played in Yugoslav federal competitions. Below is the table of the season.

Seasons in Montenegrin Republic League
Below is a score of FK Ribnica by every single season in the Montenegrin Republic League. They spent overall 19 seasons in the Republic League, which was, at majority of period, the third tier of football competition in SFR Yugoslavia and FR Yugoslavia.

Honours and achievements
 Montenegrin Third League – 1
winners (1): 2007—08
 Montenegrin Republic League – 0
runner-up (1): 1990–91
 Montenegrin Fourth League – 1
winners (1): 1983–84
Central Region Cup – 2
winners (2): 2005–06, 2006–07

Current squad 
Below is the squad of FK Ribnica for Montenegrin Third League 2016–17 season.

Coach: Boško Gazivoda

Stadium 

FK Ribnica plays their home games at Camp FSCG. Previously, from 1974 to 2010, the team had their own Stadion na Koniku, with a capacity of 750 seats. In 2010, after the expansion of quarter buildings, the old stadium was demolished.

Women's Football Club 
From 2009, FK Ribnica founded a Women's Football Club Ribnica (ŽFK Ribnica). The team played for two seasons in the Montenegrin Women's League (2010–11; 2011–12).

See also 
 Camp FSCG
 Montenegrin Third League
 Football in Montenegro
 Montenegrin clubs in Yugoslav football competitions (1946–2006)
 Podgorica

External links 
 Profile by Weltfussballarchiv

References

Association football clubs established in 1974
Football clubs in Montenegro
Football clubs in Podgorica
1974 establishments in Montenegro